Taksar is a village development committee in Syangja District in the Gandaki Zone of central Nepal. At the time of the 2011 Nepal census it had a population of 2,061 people living in 529 individual households. It is very beautiful landscape. There is the variety of ethnic groups. Taksar is only one VDC in Syangja district that borders with two districts Kaski and Tanahun.

References

External links

Populated places in Syangja District